Poottaatha Poottukkal is a 1980 Indian Tamil-language drama film written and directed by Mahendran. It is an adaptation of the novel Uravugal by Ponneelan. The film's stars Jayan and Charulata. It was released on 9 May 1980.

Plot 

Fissures occur in a married couple's relationship when they are unable to conceive a child. The wife is later enamoured by a young man who gives her attention. What happens next forms the rest of the story.

Cast 
 Jayan as Uppuli
 Charulata/Jayanthi Vijay as Kanniyamma
 Sunder Raj as Thyagu
 Archana as Velamma
 Idichapuli Selvaraj
 Kumarimuthu
Master Haja Sheriff
Samikannu as Kanniyamma's father
 Rajasekhar as Uppuli's brother
G. Srinivasan
 Baby Anju
  Annadurai Kannadhasan as the village drunkard
 Anbalaya Prabhakaran as Moorthy

Production 

Poottaatha Poottukkal is based on the novel Uravugal by writer Ponneelan. Panchu Arunachalam approached Mahendran to make a film based on this novel, despite initial reservations to direct due to its concept; he agreed after reading the end of the novel.

Mahendran felt Naseeruddin Shah and Smita Patil would be the perfect choice for this story, but Arunachalam felt Smita would create confusions in call sheets and insisted Mahendran to use local actors. Charulatha who earlier acted in Mahendran's previous film Uthiripookkal portraying Vijayan's second wife was chosen as the lead actress while Arunachalam wanted Malayalam actor Jayan for husband's character; he was eventually chosen. The filming was primarily held at Nagercoil.

Themes 
According to Ram Chander of Film Companion, the film is a "subtle meditation on the invisible forces of societal expectations that weigh on married couples".

Soundtrack 
The soundtrack was composed by Ilaiyaraaja, with lyrics by Panchu Arunachalam.

Release and reception 
According to Mahendran, Bharathiraja and Ilayaraja bought the distribution rights and released the film in Madurai and Ramanathapuram. However the film ran only for three weeks and failed at box-office. Ponneelan said, "When an artist's work is translated into a film or drama, it is important that the spirit be maintained. Though a lamp is beautiful, it is the flame which is its spirit. If you can't bring it out, better not venture into that arena".

References

Bibliography

External links 
 

1980 drama films
1980 films
1980s Tamil-language films
Films based on Indian novels
Films directed by Mahendran (filmmaker)
Films scored by Ilaiyaraaja
Films with screenplays by Mahendran (filmmaker)
Indian drama films